Bangladesh–Trinidad and Tobago relations refer to the bilateral relations between Bangladesh and Trinidad and Tobago. Neither country has a resident ambassador.

High level visits 
Bangladeshi Prime Minister Sheikh Hasina paid an official visit to Port of Spain in 2009.

Economic cooperation 
Bangladesh and Trinidad and Tobago have shown their interest in expanding the bilateral economic activities between the two countries and have been cooperating each other in this regard. Bangladeshi leather products, jute products, ceramics and pharmaceuticals have been identified as having huge potential in Trinidad and Tobago. In 2009, "Bangladesh Trade Center" was established by Bangladesh Export Promotion Bureau at Port of Spain to facilitate the bilateral trade and investment between Bangladesh and Trinidad and Tobago as well as the foreign trade of Bangladesh in the greater Caribbean and nearby Latin American markets.

References 

Trinidad and Tobago
Bilateral relations of Trinidad and Tobago
Trinidad
Bangladesh